Breeze FM is the first commercial radio station in Victoria Falls, Zimbabwe.

The radio station broadcasts to the wide and cosmopolitan audience within the 60-80 km radius from Victoria Falls. The broadcasting radius covers the urban and rural areas that surround the resort city of Victoria Falls.The radio station broadcasts in 
English and variety of local languages which include Ndebele, Nambya, Tonga, Shona and Xhosa among others.

References

External links
 webcast

Victoria Falls
Radio stations in Zimbabwe